Uniontown is an unincorporated community in Clark Township, Perry County, in the U.S. state of Indiana.

History
A post office was relocated to Uniontown from Fosters Ridge in 1890. The post office remained in operation at Uniontown until it was discontinued in 1974.

Geography

References

Unincorporated communities in Perry County, Indiana
Unincorporated communities in Indiana